is a single by Japanese boy band Kis-My-Ft2. Hikari no Signal was used as a theme song for the film Doraemon: New Nobita's Great Demon—Peko and the Exploration Party of Five. It was released on March 5, 2014. It debuted in number one on the weekly Oricon Singles Chart and reached number one on the Billboard Japan Hot 100. It was the 5th best-selling single in Japan in March 2014, with 237,696 copies. It was the 26th best-selling single of 2014 in Japan, with 244,808 copies.

References 

2014 singles
2014 songs
Japanese-language songs
Kis-My-Ft2 songs
Oricon Weekly number-one singles
Billboard Japan Hot 100 number-one singles
Japanese film songs
Songs written for animated films
Song articles with missing songwriters